The Main Western Railway is a major railway in New South Wales, Australia. It runs through the Blue Mountains, Central West, North West Slopes and the Far West regions.

Description of route 

The Main Western Railway Line is a westwards continuation of what is known as the Main Suburban Line between Sydney Central station and Granville. The line is six electrified railway tracks between Central and Strathfield, where the Main Northern line branches off. The line is then four tracks as it passes through Lidcombe, where the Main Southern line branches off, and then through the Sydney suburbs of Parramatta and Blacktown, where the Richmond railway line branches off. At St Marys, the line becomes two tracks as it passes through Penrith and Emu Plains, the extent of Sydney suburban passenger train operation. From Emu Plains, the line traverses the Blue Mountains passing through Katoomba and Mount Victoria before descending down the western side of the Blue Mountains through ten tunnels to Lithgow. Lithgow is the extent of urban electric passenger train services, although the electric wires extend slightly to Bowenfels. The line then proceeds through Wallerawang, where the line becomes single track, and then passes through Tarana, Bathurst, Blayney, Orange (where the Broken Hill line branches), Wellington, Dubbo, Narromine, Nevertire, Nyngan, Byrock and to Bourke. The section between Nyngan and Bourke is now closed.  The Central West XPT operates as far as Dubbo.

History 

The Sydney Railway Company, a private company established to serve the interests of the port of Sydney, announced proposals to build a railway line to Bathurst in 1848. The company was taken over by the New South Wales Government in 1854, and in 1855 the first railway in the state was opened between Sydney and the present-day Granville (see Rail transport in New South Wales). This railway was extended from Granville to the current Parramatta station and Blacktown in 1860 and Penrith in 1863.

The railway then crossed the Blue Mountains between 1867 and 1869. The Blue Mountains were a significant geographical barrier to the development of western New South Wales, and the crossing required significant feats of engineering for the railways, including two 'Zig Zags': one for the ascent at Lapstone, and another for the western descent. The first "little" zigzag line opened near Glenbrook in 1867 as part of the ascent of Lapstone Hill on a gradient of 1 in 30–33. It was built with comparatively light earthwork, although it included a substantial seven-span sandstone viaduct (the Knapsack Viaduct) built by engineer, John Whitton. By 1910, the line was replaced with a gentler alignment with 1 in 60 (1.67%) grades. The line reached Wentworth Falls in 1867 and Mount Victoria in 1868.

On the western descent from the Blue Mountains, the Lithgow Zig Zag was constructed between 1866 and 1869. It was laid out in the shape of a 'Z' including reversing points. It involved extremely heavy rock cuttings, three fine stone viaducts with  semi-circular arches and a short tunnel. The Lithgow Zig Zag was replaced in 1910 by a deviation, which included ten tunnels.

From the western foot of the Blue Mountains, the line was promptly extended to Wallerawang by 1870, Tarana in 1872, Bathurst, Blayney in 1876 and Orange in 1877.

By 1877, there was significant political pressure to minimise the diversion of trade from western New South Wales to Victoria and South Australia via river trade along the Darling and Murray Rivers. The town of Bourke had become the key centre for pastoralists in western New South Wales since its formation in 1861. Provision was thus made to extend the line to Dubbo, reaching Wellington in 1880 and Dubbo in 1881. At the time, Dubbo had grown into a town of strategic importance on the stock routes between northern New South Wales and the Victorian goldfields.

Beyond Dubbo, the railway opened up new land to European settlement, and was directly responsible for the development of townships. The line reached the future site of Narromine in 1883, and the railway station was the first building in the future settlement. The line reached the site of Nevertire in 1882, serving the nearby established village of Warren (a branch opened to Warren in 1898). Construction reached the site of Nyngan in 1883, with the nearby coach-stop village of Canonbar moving in its entirely to establish the town of Nyngan. It reached the temporary terminus of Byrock in 1884 before reaching its final destination of Bourke in 1885.

Wool and livestock was the main source of goods traffic on the line throughout its life. In the 1890s a severe drought caused a significant downturn in traffic. In the following decade a branch to Brewarrina (in 1901) increased its catchment while that to Walgett (in 1908) from another artery, reduced its catchment area. The line beyond Dubbo became loss-making in 1901, and continued that way throughout its existence. Tonnages increased following World War 2, but declined from the 1970s. Passenger services beyond Dubbo ended in 1974.

Electrification reached Parramatta in 1928 and Penrith in 1955. In the 1950s, the section of the line over the Blue Mountains was electrified primarily as a means of easing the haulage of coal freight from the western coalfields to the coastal ports, but a by-product of this programme was the introduction of electric interurban passenger services as far west as Bowenfels, later cut back to the current terminus of Lithgow. Since the late 1990s goods trains are now exclusively diesel hauled, with the only electric trains being passenger services using double deck interurban cars.

In 1980, quadruplication of the track between Blacktown and St Marys was completed.

In the 1990s the operator of interstate freight, the National Rail Corporation, made the decision to divert Sydney- Perth traffic from the Blue Mountains section, to travel via the Main South line to Cootamundra, and then via the cross country line to Parkes. This resulted in reduced goods traffic and subsequent reduction of the line between Wallerawang and Tarana from double to single track. Significant flooding saw the line cut between Nyngan and Bourke in April 1989, and the army destroyed a section of track north of Nyngan to relieve flood waters surrounding the town. It was not financially viable to repair and maintain the line, and the line was thus abandoned between Nyngan and Bourke.

Branch lines
Many branch lines were built or being built from and/or to the Main Western Line, some of which remain operational.

A branch line ran from Newnes Junction (near Clarence) to Newnes (now in the Wollemi National Park) from 1907 to 1932 to service an oil shale mine.  Its tunnels have become home to glow worms since their abandonment.

 The Gwabegar line opened from Wallerawang to Capertee in 1882, Mudgee in 1884, Gulgong in 1909, Craboon, and Dunedoo in 1910, Merrygoen, Binnaway and Coonabarabran in 1917 and Gwabegar in 1923. At one time it was proposed to extend it to Burren Junction to connect with the Walgett Branch Railway Line between Narrabri & Walgett and Pokataroo Railway Line North to Pokataroo & possibly Collarenebri.  The section north of Coonabarabran has not seen a train since 2005.
 The Oberon branch connected Tarana with Oberon from 1923 to 1979.
 The Blayney–Demondrille railway line connects the Main Western Line at Blayney to the Main Southern Railway Line @ Demondrille Triangular Railway Junction.
 The Cadia Mine line connected Spring Hill to Cadia iron ore mine, from 1918 to 1929 (privately operated) and 1943 to 1945.
 The Broken Hill line, now the mainline between Sydney to Perth, was constructed as a branch from the Main Western at Orange between 1885 and 1927.
 The Original Sandy Hollow (from the Merriwa Branch Railway Line) to Maryvale Triangular Railway Junction on the Main Western Railway Line @  (Completed from Sandy Hollow to Gulgong Section to the Gwabegar Railway Line @ Gulgong only.)
 Dubbo to Molong (Broken Hill Line)
 The Coonamble branch was built from Dubbo to Gilgandra and Coonamble in 1903.
 The Dubbo to Merrygoen line was opened in 1918, connecting with the Gwabegar Railway Line to Binnaway then a bit of shunting, then Binnaway to Werris Creek line in 1923. These lines completed an inland route from Junee on the Main South line to the Hunter Region.
 The Parkes- Narromine line was opened from Narromine as an overland route to the Broken Hill line at Parkes (and eventually to the Main South line at Junee). It opened to Peak Hill in 1910 and Parkes in 1914.
 The Warren line, a short branch from Nevertire to Warren opened in 1898.
 The Cobar line was built from Nyngan to Cobar in 1894 and the CSA Mine ( northwest of Cobar) in 1963.
 The Brewarrina line was built from Byrock to Brewarrina in 1901 and closed in 1974.

Present operation

Goods traffic continues as far as Nyngan, to and from the Cobar branch which connects at this point. NSW TrainLink operates the Central West Express XPT service to Dubbo. The section between Sydney and Orange carries the Indian Pacific train to Perth (via the Broken Hill line) and the once weekly NSW TrainLink Sydney to Broken Hill Xplorer DMU. The section to Lithgow carries electric commuter trains to and from Sydney (the Blue Mountains Line).

References

Further reading
 Across the Tableland, "Bathurst to Orange Singleton", C.C. Australian Railway Historical Society Bulletin, June 1940
 Across the Tableland, "Orange to Dubbo" Singleton, C.C. Australian Railway Historical Society Bulletin, July 1940
 
 The Western Plains Section, "Dubbo to Bourke" Singleton, C.C. Australian Railway Historical Society Bulletin, September 1940
 
 many notes and numbers  

 
Far West (New South Wales)
Railways with Zig Zags
Standard gauge railways in Australia